Woodside Morris are a UK Morris dance side based in Watford, Hertfordshire. The side dance Cotswold morris locally in the towns and villages around Watford, Rickmansworth, Hemel Hempstead and St Albans, and further afield at events and folk festivals across the country, as well as occasional trips abroad.

Origins of Woodside Morris Men 

Woodside Morris Men were formed in Finchley, North London. The name comes from the school at which the Phoenix Folk Club met, which happened to be situated in a part of Finchley known as Woodside Park. The decision to form a men's Morris side to perform the Cotswold dance traditions, along with a little Rapper Sword Dancing, was taken following the Phoenix club's 1956 Whit Monday tour. Previously the club had flirted with Morris as one of their many folk activities, but it was felt that the time had come for a permanent, dedicated Morris section.

The man charged with organising the new Morris club was Edmund 'Eddie' Reavell. Eddie would go on to become Squire of the side in the long term, but in seeking guidance for getting the club together, and developing a repertoire, he obtained the help of legendary dancer and instructor, Bert Cleaver. Bert Cleaver took on the role of Squire during this formative time for the club, and under his eye, and the organisation of Eddie Reavell, the club gained members, produced a kit utilising a purpose designed tree emblem to reflect the name, and prepared to dance out in public. The first official meeting of the club took place in September 1956, and it was almost exactly a year later that they finally kitted up and danced in anger for the first time.

From the start, Woodside Morris Men adopted the profile of a team that would seek association with the Morris Ring - all male membership with officers and a constitution that reflected Ring policy. Fittingly then, it was a Morris Ring event at which they first danced; the association's 61st meeting, hosted by Thames Valley Morris Men, and based around Kingston upon Thames, London . Two years later, at the 68th meeting of the Ring, the side danced for the first time as members; the now Squire Eddie Reavell being presented with Woodside's staff of association by Ring Squire Jim Phillips .

The early years for the club were taken up with local social and community events, regular involvement with Morris Ring meetings, and privately arranged trips to various locations, though Deal, Kent was a particular favourite, in the company of Westminster Morris Men, and later joined by the Hammersmith Morris Men. at this time, there were a few dancers that were involved in just about all of these three side's at one time or another. Bert Cleaver had ended his direct association with Woodside when they reached the stage where they were ready to dance out, and subsequently became involved with a few other London sides, and would go on to become Squire of the Morris Ring. Another busy Morris Man was Hugh Rippon, who at that time was something of a Morris firebrand, being involved with all of these teams to some extent, and remains to this day an influential figure on the English folk scene.

Originally, Woodside Morris Men were intended to remain part of the Phoenix Folk Club, but discussion with a number of early members indicates that the link to the parent club was tenuous from the very start. If it were intended that the membership should originally be drawn from the Phoenix Club, then such expectations were sadly not met. In March 1965, Woodside Squire, Graham Wild, wrote a letter to all members of the team to inform them that, for one week only, the side would be meeting at the Railway Club, Watford, for practice, but not to worry, as practice would return to Finchley as soon as possible. As much as this may not have been an intentional first step away from the now only notionally parent club, as well as the area in which the club was formed, a page in the history of Woodside Morris Men had been turned, and there would be no going back. By July of that same year, meetings had been firmly established as taking place at the Railway's social club in Watford.

Life in Watford 

One of Woodside's members was an employee of British Rail, and also a member of their British Railways Staff Association, which had premises just off the St Albans Road in Watford. This member was able to arrange a favourable rate for using one of the rooms on a Wednesday evening, for reasons of practise.

As well as the side moving to the area for rehearsals, they also started to gravitate their other activities, such as feast evenings and days of dance, into the surrounding towns and villages. 

At this time, Woodside were still very active in the Morris Ring, and the profile of events that were participated in was dominated by days of dance, and Ring meetings. The countryside surrounding Watford was ideal for hosting other teams for club events and the move to a more suburban area meant less competition from the wealth of London sides. Woodside became involved in local community events, even appearing at the assembly rooms of the Watford Town Hall, an internationally recognised recording venue for major orchestral and operatic projects. All this activity in and around the side's new home didn't prevent Woodside from continuing to dance at some of their old haunts in London, a legacy that is still apparent today.

Relationships changed with the London sides, which was as much to do the change in membership as it was to do with the change of base, and Woodside looked to form new bonds with teams based outside London. Just as the side were settling in comfortably to their new environment, disaster struck, albeit on a rather minor scale.

In 1969, having discovered that Woodside's British Rail employee member had long since parted for pastures new, the Railway Club decided that the accommodation agreement was no longer appropriate. Woodside Morris Men promptly found themselves without a home. A few new venues were tried stop gap, but eventually, by the end of the year, an agreement had been made with the Hertfordshire County Council Divisional Education Officer to set up camp on a long term base at Chater School, Watford.

The side moved on and it was business as usual, for a while, when the side moved to the Red Lion in Nash Mills, near Hemel Hempstead. This era saw a dwindling membership, which in turn led to a reduction in funds, which are usually raised through membership, collections at dance outs and fees for performances. It became difficult to maintain the side, culminating in the team failing to meet throughout the whole of 1973.

Throughout this period, it was down to the determination and correspondence of then Bagman Mike 'Lank' Broughton, that the team continued in even this notional form. Lank was a dancer of many years experience, he had seen William Kimber perform at the Royal Albert Hall, and had danced in Watford on the Queen's Coronation Day - though which Queen he has never disclosed. Lank had joined Woodside when they moved to Watford, and if it had not been for his involvement, it seems likely that Woodside's history would have ended c 1972. Having struggled to raise a side for a number of events in that year, there was no choice but to suspend activities until new membership could be found. Lank already had a plan that he suspected could change the club's current bad fortune, and although the side did not meet during 1973, the Bagman was not idle.

Lank's hard work paid off, and salvation came to the team, providing not only a new base of operations, but also a ready made pool of members.

The Pump House Theatre and Arts Centre 

In the early 1970s, the old Water Board buildings just off Watford's Lower High Street, which had fallen into disrepair following many years of sterling service, became the location of a local centre for arts groups. One particular group, which was particularly influential in the development of the Pump House Theatre and Arts Centre, as it came to be known, was the Watford Folk Club. Woodside's interest in the project, and willingness to become actively involved, created a link not only with the Pump House, where the side still meet today, but also with the Folk Club. What seemed a promising venue for the previously struggling side, also became the source of many new dancers. It had taken a lot of hard work on the part of Lank to negotiate a place at the Pump House, lobbying the committee throughout the preceding year to allow Woodside a home on Wednesday nights, and in the end a place was found - originally in a much smaller venue than the current Colne River Rooms - on the grounds that the side be associated with the folk club. 

The new membership brought with it a slightly changed attitude to dance venues, and the frequency of dancing out. Where pub's had never been a deterrent to Woodside Morris Men, they now became the mainstay for performances. This was not a complete change in attitude - the tours, [Morris Ring] meetings, days of dance and feasts still remained part of the side's schedule - but the pub evenings became an opportunity to dance out more regularly, and to promote Woodside in the local area.

External links
 Woodside Morris Men
 The Morris Ring
 The Pump House Theatre and Arts Centre

Morris dance